Myersina is a genus of ray-finned fish  from the family Gobiidae, the true gobies which are found from the Atlantic coast of South Africa through the Indian Ocean to the western Pacific Ocean. The generic name honours the American ichthyologist George S. Myers (1905-1985) who was a younger colleague of Herre's at the time at which he described the genus and who went on to be president of the American Society of Ichthyologists and Herpetologists, the head of the Division of Fishes at the United States National Museum and an ichthyologist for the United States Fish and Wildlife Service.

Species
There are currently nine recognized species in this genus:
 Myersina adonis Shibukawa & Satapoomin, 2006 (Adonis shrimpgoby)
 Myersina crocata (Wongratana, 1975) (Yellow-spotted shrimpgoby)
 Myersina filifer (Valenciennes, 1837) (Filamentous shrimpgoby)
 Myersina lachneri Hoese & Lubbock, 1982 (Lachner's shrimpgoby)
 Myersina macrostoma Herre, 1934 (Bigmouth shrimpgoby)
 Myersina nigrivirgata Akihito & Meguro, 1983 (Black-line shrimp-goby)
 Myersina papuanus (W. K. H. Peters, 1877)
 Myersina pretoriusi (J. L. B. Smith, 1958) (Pondoland sailfin goby)
 †Myersina yangii (T. R. Chen, 1960)

References

Gobiidae